Progonos means "forefather" or "ancestor" and may refer to:

Progon, Lord of Kruja or Progonos (fl. 1190-1198), first Albanian ruler
Progonos Sgouros (fl. 1294-1300), Byzantine military commander

See also
Progon (disambiguation)